Amarna letter EA 35, titled The Hand of Nergal, is a moderate length clay tablet letter from the king of Alashiya (modern Cyprus) to the king (pharaoh) of Egypt (photo, high resolution ). The letter has multiple short paragraphs, with scribed, single-lines showing the paragraphing. Paragraphs I-VII are on the letter's obverse; paragraph VIII starts at the bottom edge and continues, ending at Paragraph XIII on the clay tablet's reverse.

The letter is located in the British Museum, no. 29788. The clay surface shows a gloss, implying a quality of the clay preparation. Small edges/ corners of the clay tablet letter are broken, damaged, or missing.

The topics of the letter concern an epidemic afflicting the country: The Hand of Nergal, trade for silver and copper (copper from Alašiya), and timber. A discussion of politics, concerning island individuals, and the two countries' messengers concern the second half of the letter.

The Amarna letters, about 300, numbered up to EA 382, are mid 14th century BC, about 1350 BC and 25? years later, correspondence. The initial corpus of letters were found at Akhenaten's city Akhetaten, in the floor of the Bureau of Correspondence of Pharaoh; others were later found, adding to the body of letters.

EA 35, obverse 

Moran's non-linear letter English language translation (translated from the French language):

(Lines 1-5)--S[ay to the k]ing of Egypt, my brother: [Message] of the king of Alašiya, your brother. [F]or me all goes well. For my household, my wives,1 my sons, my magnates, my horses, my chariots, and in my country, all goes very well. For my brother
(6-9)--may all go well. For your household, your wives, your sons, your magnates, your horses, your chariots, and in your country, may all go very well. My brother, I herewith send my messenger with your messenger – to Egypt.
(10-15)--I herewith send to you 500 ( talents ) of copper.2 As my brother's greeting-gift, I send it to you. My brother, do not be concerned that the amount of copper is small. Behold, the Hand of Nergal3  is now in my country; he has slain all the men of my country, and there is not a (single) copper-worker.4 So, my brother, do not be concerned.
(16-18)--Send your messenger with my messenger immediately, and I will send you whatever copper you, my brother, request.
(19-22)--You are my brother. May he send me silver in very great quantities. My brother, give me the very best silver, and then I will send you, my brother, whatever you, my brother request.
(23-26)--Moreover-( ša-ni-tam), my brother, give me the ox that my messenger requests,5 my brother, and send me, my brother, 2 kukkubu-containers of "sweet oil," my brother, and send me one of the experts in vulture augury.6(27-29)--Moreover-( ša-ni-tam), my brother, men of my country, keep speaking with m[e] about my timber that the king of Egypt receives from me. My brother, [ give me ] the payment due.7'--(obverse EA 35, lines 1-29, with minor lacunae)

 Specific signs, EA 35 

 ŠEŠ 
Sign ŠEŠ, (100x24px), is used throughout EA 35 (and the Alashiya letters). As brother, and mostly brother-mine, "...my brother,...", it is the sumerogramic use as ŠEŠ (brother Sumerogram). In EA 35 it averages about two uses per paragraph.

 Cuneiform bar, (as .MAŠ) 
Cuneiform bar,  (also maš) is used in EA 35 for "god Nergal". It is found in the text as DMAŠ.MAŠ. (EA 35:13, etc.), (as: 100x24px).

 See also 
Alashiya
Amarna letters–phrases and quotations
List of Amarna letters by size
Amarna letter EA 5, EA 9, EA 15, EA 19, EA 26, EA 27, EA 35, EA 38 
EA 153, EA 161, EA 288, EA 364, EA 365, EA 367

 References 

Moran, William L. The Amarna Letters. Johns Hopkins University Press, 1987, 1992. (softcover)

 External links 
EA 35, obverse (high resolution); EA 35, short letter synopsis
British Museum website for EA 35 (E29788), with Height & Width
Line Drawing, cuneiform, and Akkadian, EA 35: Obverse & Reverse, CDLI no. P270891 (Chicago Digital Library Initiative'')
CDLI listing of all EA Amarna letters, 1-382

Alashiya
Amarna letters
Middle Eastern objects in the British Museum